The Regina Cougars women's ice hockey program represents the University of Regina in the Canada West Universities Athletic Association conference of U Sports. The head coach of the program is Sarah Hodges, who has served in the capacity since the 1998–99 season.

History

Season-by-season Record

Season team scoring champion

All-time scoring leaders

Awards and honours
Toni Ross, 2016 Hockey Canada Isobel Gathorne-Hardy Award

CIS/USports Awards
Brandy West: 2000-01 Brodrick Trophy (awarded to the CIS Player of the Year)
Erin Tady, CIS Rookie of the Year (2001)
Karissa Swan, CIS Rookie of the Year (2006)

All-Canadians
Joell Fiddler, CIS Second Team All-Canadian (2005)
Arielle Schade, CIS All-Canadians (2006-07)
Brandy West, CIS All-Canadian (1999-2000, 2000-01, 2001-02)

All-Rookie Team
Erin Tady, CIS All-Rookie Team (2001)
Karissa Swan, CIS All-Rookie Team (2006)  
Alexis Larson, CIS All-Rookie Team (2013)

Canada West honours
Sarah Hodges, Canada West Coach of the Year in 2015-16
Jane Kish, Canada West First Star of the Week (awarded January 14, 2020)

Canada West Player of the Year
Brandy West, Canada West Player of the Year (1999, 2000, 2001)

Canada West Rookie of the Year
Brandy West, Canada West Rookie of the Year (1999)

Canada West All-Stars
Brandy West, Canada West First-Team All-Star (1999, 2000, 2001) 
Rianne Wight, 2012-13 Canada West Second Tea 
Jaycee Magwood, 2019-20 Canada West Second-Team All-Star
Tamara McVannel, 2019-20 Canada West Second-Team All-Star

Canada West All-Rookie
 Jaycee Magwood, 2015-16 U Sports All-Rookie Team
 Jordan Kulbida, 2017-18 Canada West All-Rookie Team
Paige Hubbard, 2019-20 Canada West All-Rookie Team

University Awards
2019-20 Regina Cougars Female Rookie of the Year: Paige Hubbard

University of Regina Sports Hall of Fame
Brandy West was the first Regina Cougars women's hockey player to be inducted into the University of Regina Sports Hall of Fame, gaining induction in 2011.

International
Kylie Gavelin, Forward : 2017 Winter Universiade 
Alexis Larson, Defense : 2017 Winter Universiade 
Jaycee Magwood, Forward : 2017 Winter Universiade

Cougars in professional hockey

References

 U Sports women's ice hockey teams
Women's ice hockey teams in Canada
 
 Sport in Regina, Saskatchewan
 Ice hockey teams in Saskatchewan
Women in Saskatchewan